Amos Nzeyi is a Ugandan businessman, entrepreneur, and industrialist. He is one of the wealthiest people in Uganda.

Business interests
Nzeyi has owned the following businesses wholly or in part:

 "Crown Beverages Limited" – A bottler of Pepsi products. As of April 2013, he was chairman of the board and part-owner.
 Hot Loaf Bakery – A private bakery in Kampala, Uganda. He is the owner and chairman of the board.
 White Horse Inn – A private hotel in Kabale, Uganda. As of April 2015, he was the proprietor.
 Nandos Restaurant – A fast-food restaurant in the center of Kampala, which Nzeyi formerly co-owned.
 National Bank of Commerce – A small commercial bank, founded in 1991 by private investors, since closed by the Bank of Uganda.

Other responsibilities
Besides his personal business interests, Nzeyi has had the following public, fiduciary responsibilities:
 He is a former member of the board of directors of the Uganda Development Bank.
 Nzeyi is the chairman of the Uganda Manufacturers' Association. He was elected to a second and final two-year term in May 2015.
Dr. Amos Nzeyi is Honorary Consul for Mauritian in Kampala, Uganda. The Consulate of Mauritius is the first representation of Mauritius in Uganda established in 2018 following the appointment of Dr Amos Nzeyi as the Honorary Consul.

Temangalo Saga
The total price was US$5,568,000.

Subsequent inquiry into the transaction, commonly referred to as the Temangalo Saga, discovered irregularities in the transaction. Both the managing director of the NSSF and his deputy were terminated because of this transaction. In a subsequent cabinet reshuffle, Minister of Finance Ezra Suruma, whose ministry was responsible for supervising and approving the transaction, was dropped from the cabinet.

As of March 2010, the saga had not yet been resolved.  of the land in question, including one of the personal residences of Nzeyi that sits on that land, had yet to be transferred to NSSF, despite having paid for it in 2008.

See also
 List of wealthiest people in Uganda

References

External links
 Transcript of Amos Nzeyi's appearance before the parliamentary committee probing the Temangalo Saga
 Forbes – Five Ugandan Multi-Millionaires You Should Know

Ugandan businesspeople
Living people
People from Kabale District
1947 births